"We Don't Care" is a song by British DJ Sigala and British pop rock band The Vamps. It was released as a digital download on 27 July 2018 via Ministry of Sound. The song was written by Sigala, Ella Eyre, Richard Boardman, Pablo Bowman, Aryan Nasr, Adam Knights and Saman Kadduri.

Music video
A lyric video to accompany the release of "We Don't Care" was first released on YouTube on 26 July 2018.

Charts

Release history

References

2018 singles
2018 songs
The Vamps (British band) songs
Sigala songs
Songs written by Sigala
Songs written by Richard Boardman
Songs written by Ella Eyre
Ministry of Sound singles
Songs written by Pablo Bowman